Sentimental Ballad is a 1940 painting by the American artist Grant Wood. It depicts a group of singing men in a bar.

The painting is located at the New Britain Museum of American Art in New Britain, Connecticut.

Creation
The painting came to be because of Wood's art dealer Associated American Artists and the film producer Walter Wanger, who commissioned nine popular artists to paint a motif from the upcoming film The Long Voyage Home, directed by John Ford. The other artists who participated were Thomas Benton, George Biddle, James Chapin, Ernest Fiene, Robert Philipp, Luis Quintanilla Isasi, Raphael Soyer and Georges Schreiber. The artists visited the set of the film for several weeks in May 1940. Wood's scene is toward the end of the film and features, from left to right, the actors John Qualen, John Wayne, Barry Fitzgerald, Thomas Mitchell, Joe Sawyer, David Hughes and Jack Pennick.

Reception
Although originally commissioned for the marketing of a film, the painting was well received in the press and went on to tour American museums.

References

1940 paintings
Paintings by Grant Wood
Paintings in Connecticut
Works based on films
Musical instruments in art
Food and drink paintings